Catalina is a community located on the eastern side of the Bonavista Peninsula, in the province of Newfoundland and Labrador, Canada. Catalina adjoins the union town of Port Union, the town built for and home to the Fisherman's Union Company established by Sir William Coaker.

The name of the town is purported by E.S. Seary to derive from the French Havre Sainte-Katherine which was later changed to the Spanish name Cataluna.

In 2005 Catalina was amalgamated with Little Catalina, Melrose and Port Union to form the town of Trinity Bay North.

Transportation
Highway 230 (Discovery Trail/Cabot Street) and 237 (Church Street) are the main routes to and from Catalina.

See also
 List of communities in Newfoundland and Labrador

References

Populated coastal places in Canada
Populated places in Newfoundland and Labrador
Former towns in Newfoundland and Labrador
Trinity Bay North